The 2017–18 Adelaide Strikers Women's season was the third in the team's history. Coached by Andrea McCauley and captained by Suzie Bates, the Strikers finished the regular season of WBBL03 in fourth place. They were subsequently knocked out of the tournament via a 17-run semi-final loss to the Sydney Sixers at Adelaide Oval.

Squad
Each WBBL|03 squad featured 15 active players, with an allowance of up to five marquee signings including a maximum of three from overseas. Australian marquees were defined as players who made at least ten limited-overs appearances for the national team in the three years prior to the cut-off date (24 April 2017).

Personnel changes made ahead of the season included:

 New Zealand marquee Suzie Bates signed with the Strikers, departing the Perth Scorchers. Bates was also appointed captain of the team, taking over the role from Tegan McPharlin (3–9 win–loss record).
 Sarah Coyte departed the Strikers, initially retiring from cricket before returning later in the season with the Sydney Sixers.
 England marquee Charlotte Edwards retired from cricket after WBBL02 and took on assistant coaching role for the team.
 Former Australian players Sarah Elliott and Shelley Nitschke also retired from cricket after WBBL|02.
 Rhiannon Dick signed with the Strikers, departing the Sydney Sixers.

The table below lists the Strikers players and their key stats (including runs scored, batting strike rate, wickets taken, economy rate, catches and stumpings) for the season.

Ladder

Fixtures
All times are local time

Regular season

The Strikers recorded the first-ever one-wicket victory in WBBL history, defeating the Stars on the last ball of the match. Requiring three runs with one delivery remaining, Tabatha Saville scored a boundary off leg-spinner Kristen Beams to clinch a narrow win for her team.

Knockout phase

Statistics and awards

 Most runs: Suzie Bates – 434 (5th in the league)
 Highest score in an innings: Suzie Bates – 102 (65) vs Hobart Hurricanes, 10 December 2017
 Most wickets: Sophie Devine, Amanda-Jade Wellington – 17 each (equal 4th in the league) 
 Best bowling figures in an innings: Amanda-Jade Wellington – 3/9 (4 overs) vs Hobart Hurricanes, 10 December 2017
 Most catches (fielder): Suzie Bates – 12 (2nd in the league)
 Player of the Match awards:
 Tahlia McGrath – 3
 Sophie Devine – 2
 Suzie Bates, Alex Price, Tabatha Saville – 1 each
 Strikers Most Valuable Player: Sophie Devine
 WBBL|03 Player of the Tournament: Suzie Bates (equal 4th)
 WBBL|03 Team of the Tournament: Sophie Devine
 WBBL|03 Young Gun Award: Tabatha Saville (nominated)

References

2017–18 Women's Big Bash League season by team
Adelaide Strikers (WBBL)